JaCorey Williams (born June 12, 1994) is an American basketball player for Napoli Basket of the Italian Lega Basket Serie A (LBA). He played college basketball at Middle Tennessee State University, where he was named the Conference USA Player of the Year in 2017.

College career
A 6'8" power forward, Williams came from Central Park Christian High School in Birmingham, Alabama and originally attended the University of Arkansas. He played three seasons for the Razorbacks, averaging 4.8 points per game in three seasons for the team. In the summer of 2015 he was dismissed from the team after multiple incidents in the offseason. 

Williams transferred to Middle Tennessee for his last season of eligibility, where he averaged 17.3 points and 7.3 rebounds per game for the Conference USA champion Blue Raiders, leading the team to the 2017 NCAA Tournament.  They upset Minnesota from the Big Ten Conference before falling to Butler. At the close of the season, Williams was named the Conference player of the Year.

Professional career

Canton Charge (2017–2018)
Williams signed an agreement on June 23, 2017 to play in the NBA Summer League with the defending NBA champions Golden State Warriors. He then signed to join the Cleveland Cavaliers roster for training camp on September 26, 2017. He was waived the next day so that Cleveland could sign new free agent Dwyane Wade. On November 2, 2017, Williams joined the Canton Charge, the Cavaliers' NBA G League team. In 49 games for the Charge, he averaged 15.4 points and 7.5 rebounds per game.

Hapoel Gilboa Galil (2018)
On March 22, 2018, Williams signed with the Israeli team Hapoel Gilboa Galil for the rest of the season. On April 21, 2018, Williams recorded a double-double and season-high of 18 points and 11 rebounds, shooting 8-of-15 from the field, along with two steals in a 78–76 win over Maccabi Rishon LeZion. Williams helped Gilboa Galil reach the 2018 Israeli League Playoffs, where they eventually were eliminated by Hapoel Jerusalem.

Return to the Charge (2018–2019)
On September 16, 2018 the Cleveland Cavaliers signed Williams to a training camp contract, but was waived by the Cavaliers four days later. He then rejoined the Cavaliers’ G League affiliate, the Canton Charge. In 50 games played for the Charge, he averaged 15.2 points, 7 rebounds and 2.3 assists per game.

Ulsan Mobis Phoebus (2019–2020)
On July 27, 2019, Williams signed with Ulsan Mobis Phoebus of the Korean Basketball League.

PAOK Thessaloniki (2020)
On January 23, 2020, Williams signed with Greek club PAOK, along with M. J. Rhett. He averaged 8.3 points and 6.7 rebounds per game in six games.

Aquila Basket Trento (2020–2021)
On August 1, 2020, Williams signed for Aquila Basket Trento of the Italian Lega Basket Serie A (LBA) and EuroCup Basketball.

JL Bourg (2021–2022)
On July 20, 2021, Williams signed for JL Bourg of the French LNB Pro A. JL Bourg also plays in the EuroCup.

Napoli Basket (2022–present)
On July 5, 2022, he has signed with Napoli Basket of the Italian Lega Basket Serie A (LBA).

The Basketball Tournament
Williams joined Herd That, a team composed primarily of Marshall alumni, in The Basketball Tournament 2020. He scored 30 points in a 102-99 come-from-behind win over the Money Team in the second round.

References

External links
Middle Tennessee Blue Raiders bio
RealGM profile

1994 births
Living people
American expatriate basketball people in Israel
American expatriate basketball people in Italy
American men's basketball players
Aquila Basket Trento players
Arkansas Razorbacks men's basketball players
Basketball players from Birmingham, Alabama
Canton Charge players
Hapoel Gilboa Galil Elyon players
JL Bourg-en-Bresse players
Lega Basket Serie A players
Middle Tennessee Blue Raiders men's basketball players
P.A.O.K. BC players
Power forwards (basketball)
Napoli Basket players